The All Burma Federation of Student Unions (ABFSU) is a left-wing umbrella organization for student unions in Burma (also Myanmar). ABFSU offers a source of information to the outside world, reporting regularly on the developments of the military government.

History 

ABFSU has been on the front of resistance against numerous governments in charge of Myanmar for more than 70 years. From British Raj, State of Burma, Burma Socialist Programme Party, to State Administration Council.

Over time, the group’s interests have changed numerous times.

The roots of ABFSU extend back to the Burmese independence movement of the 1930s. In 1931, the Rangoon University Students’ Union (RUSU) was formed as a social organization by Aung San, the later military General and so-called ‘father of Burmese independence’, and, paternal father of 1991 Nobel Peace Laureate Aung San Suu Kyi. In 1931, the Rangoon University Students’ Union (RUSU) was formed as a social organization. In 1935, Aung San and his colleagues U Nu (later the first democratically elected Prime Minister of Burma), U Thein Pe (later the General Secretary of Communist Party of Burma), U Ba Swe (later the Prime Minister) and U Kyaw Nyein (later the Deputy Prime Minister) became the leaders of the RUSU and led the second university students’ strike against British colonial rule. 
In 1935, RUSU leaders led the second university students’ strike against British colonial rule which was hampered by the Pacific War hampered. On May 8, 1936, the first students’ conference was held in Rangoon. Organized by RUSU, it marked the formation of the All Burma Students’ Union (ABSU). In 1951, the All Burma Students’ Union (ABSU) changed its name to the All Burma Federation of Student Unions (ABFSU) to represent all students in Burma.

ABFSU became active in campaigning for education reforms. During the Sixth Conference of the ABFSU in 1960, the so-called ‘five policies’, and ‘three flags’ of the organization were adopted, which has been fundamental in the creation of Democratic Centralism within the organization.

Burma's fledgling democratic process came to a halt in 1962 when General Ne Win staged a coup d'etat in which hundreds of protesting students were killed. The turbulent political situation since that time, characterised by kleptocratic, socialistic and paranoid authoritarian rule, has forced ABFSU and its members underground on a number of occasions.

In 1988, as calls for democratic change brought civil unrest and mass demonstrations to the streets of the capital Rangoon once more, ABFSU publicly re-emerged under the direction of leading dissident Min Ko Naing (a nom-de-guerre meaning ‘conqueror of kings’), where the group helped to coordinate waves of pro-democracy action, culminating in the 8888 Uprising.
Since 1990 ABFSU have thrown their support behind the National League for Democracy (NLD), Burma's foremost political party which won a landslide victory in the general election of that year. The Generals were not prepared to hand over power, however, and instead chose to place the party leader, Aung San Suu Kyi, under house arrest.

Some within the ranks of Burma's student protestors have criticised the NLD for not implementing a strategy for taking control after the 1990 elections and, despite overwhelming support, allowing the Generals to continue acting with impunity.

The main five basic principles of ABFSU are:
 National Politics
 Democracy
 Democratic Education
 Safeguarding Students' Right
 Peace

ABFSU's prominent leaders 

Many of those associated with ABFSU over the years have been hugely influential in Burma's ongoing political struggles. However, their links to ABFSU made them increasingly ‘marked men’. Always the target of the military government, the leaders of the ABFSU are regularly imprisoned where they are beaten, tortured and denied medical treatment. Such human rights violations are s widespread in Burma today but, significantly, they appear not to have had the desired effect of permanently silencing or disbanding ABFSU or given Myanmar's  Saffron Revolution, quelling the wider calls for democratic change.

Some of the notable individuals associated with ABSFU over the years are:

Aung San ( Military General and known as the ‘independence hero’, father of the nation and paternal father to Aung San Suu Kyi)
 Ko Ba Hein (The founder of Communist Party of Burma)
Ko Hla Shwe (the leader of 1938 Worker's Uprising)
Min Ko Naing (1988) leader of ABFSU and Burma's leading political dissident
 Kyaw Ko Ko (2007) the President of ABFSU which was re-established in 2007 (during the Saffron Revolution)

References 

 Facebook Page Of ABFSU - 

 Twitter Account Of ABFSU - 

 Telegram Channel Of ABFSU -

External links 

 Facebook Page Of ABFSU - 
 Twitter Account Of ABFSU - 
 Telegram Channel Of ABFSU - 

All Burma Federation of Student Unions: 
Burma Campaign UK: Home
US Campaign for Burma: US Campaign for Burma
YouTube - ABFSU anthem and photo gallery: 

Student organizations established in 1936
Student organisations in Myanmar